Rock Art is the 11th studio album by the English rock band Magnum and was released in 1994 by EMI. It was the last album released by the band's first incarnation.

The album got its name because Tony Clarkin watched a documentary about cave paintings from the stone age.

Two singles were released from the album, "The Tall Ships" and "Back In Your Arms Again". However, they were only distributed in Germany. "On Christmas Day" is a reflection on the World War I Christmas truce in December 1914, involving French, Scottish and German soldiers.

The album charted 57 in the United Kingdom, the band's lowest chart position there since Magnum II. The band disbanded the next year, with Tony Clarkin and Bob Catley forming Hard Rain.

Track listing

Singles
The Tall Ships CD (1994)
 "The Tall Ships" [edit] - 3:55
 "The Tall Ships" [LP version] - 5:06
 "Hard Hearted Woman" [LP version] - 3:49
 "You Don't Have To Be Baby To Cry" (Tony Clarkin) [B-side] - 5:24

Back In Your Arms Again CD (1994)
 "Back In Your Arms Again" [LP version] - 5:59
 "Hush-A-Bye Baby" [LP version] - 4:48
 "Don't Start Me Talking" (Sonny Boy Williamson) [B-side] - 2:41
 "Big Hunk O' Love" (Aaron Schroeder and Sid Wyche) [B-side] - 2:59

Personnel
Tony Clarkin - guitar
Bob Catley - vocals
Wally Lowe - bass guitar
Mark Stanway - keyboards
Mickey Barker - drums

Additional musicians
Jacki Graham - backing vocals
Mo Birch - backing vocals
P.J. Wright - pedal steel guitars

Production
Arranged by Magnum
Engineered and mixed by Stephen Harris
Sound engineer - Mike Cowling
Recorded at Abbey Road, London, and Zella Studios, Birmingham
Artwork by Eleanor Smith
Photography by Simon Harding Photography
Electronic design & art direction — BAVIEmage
Rock Art was recorded on 3M 996 tape

References

External links
 www.magnumonline.co.uk — Official Magnum site

1994 albums
Magnum (band) albums
Albums produced by Tony Clarkin
EMI Records albums